Treetod Sonjance (born 1956) is a former Thai air force officer. He served as commander-in-chief of the Royal Thai Air Force from 1 October 2014 to 30 September 2016. Johm Rungsawang was appointed as his successor.

He was a member of the board of directors of Thai Airways from April 2017 to May 2019.

References 

Living people
1956 births
Place of birth missing (living people)
Treetod Sonjance
Treetod Sonjance
Treetod Sonjance